Zandrѐ Swartz (born 15 May 1991) is a South African cricketer. He made his first-class debut for Griqualand West in the 2009–10 CSA Provincial Three-Day Challenge on 22 October 2009.

References

External links
 

1991 births
Living people
South African cricketers
Griqualand West cricketers
Northern Cape cricketers
Place of birth missing (living people)